James Nolan Mason (born July 25, 1952) is an American neo-Nazi. Mason is an ideologue for the Atomwaffen Division, a neo-Nazi terrorist organization. After growing disillusioned with the mass movement approach of neo-Nazi movements, he began advocating for white revolution through terrorism. He was referred to as the "Godfather of Fascist Terrorism" in the Fair Observer. He has been convicted of assault and weapons charges, as well as charged with sexual exploitation and possession of pornographic images of a minor. In 2021, Mason is one of only two individuals sanctioned by the Canadian Government on its list of terror-related entities.

Early life and activism
Mason grew up in Chillicothe, Ohio. In SIEGE, Mason recounted having been interested in politics at a young age, describing how his father once took him to a Richard Nixon rally in 1960. He would continue to support mainstream conservative politicians like Berry Goldwater and eventually populist ones like George Wallace. Sometime after supporting the latter, Mason would describe this as the last instance of himself supporting mainstream political parties. In 1966, when he was 14 years old, he joined the youth movement of George Lincoln Rockwell's American Nazi Party (ANP). In 1968, when he was 16, Mason planned to murder the principal and other staff members at his high school. Instead, following the advice of William Luther Pierce, he quit school and began working at the ANP headquarters in Virginia.

After the assassination of Rockwell in 1967, Mason aligned himself with the National Socialist White People's Party (NSWPP) and Joseph Tommasi's National Socialist Liberation Front (NSLF). In 1970, at the age of 18, Mason became a full-fledged member of the NSWPP and returned to Chillicothe.

In the early 1980s, Mason began corresponding with Sandra Good and Lynette Fromme, two followers of Charles Manson. In 1982, along with Manson, Mason founded Universal Order, an organization that encouraged terror with notoriety, similar to that achieved by the Manson Family.

Criminal charges and convictions
In 1973, Mason and fellow neo-Nazi Greg Hurles deployed tear gas against several Black teenagers in the parking lot of a Dairy Queen. Mason was convicted of assault and sentenced to six months in a Cincinnati workhouse.

In 1988 and 1991, police raided Mason's home in Ohio and seized pornographic photos of a 15-year-old girl. In 1992, he pleaded guilty to two counts of "illegal use of a minor in nudity-oriented material", for which he was sentenced to a $500 fine and a suspended sentence.

In May 1994, Mason was arrested and charged with two counts of sexual exploitation of a minor and two counts of contributing to the delinquency of a minor. Mason threatened his ex-girlfriend, who was then 16 years old, and a Latino man whom she had been dating, with a firearm. Mason struck a plea bargain and was convicted of weapons charges, for which he was sentenced to three years of incarceration before being released in August 1999.

Atomwaffen Division

Mason's writings in the Siege newsletter, which have been compiled into a book, have been credited with forming a large part of the Atomwaffen Division's ideological foundation. In an interview with Frontline, Mason claimed he was approached by members of the Atomwaffen Division who wished to recruit him as an ideological advisor to which he obliged. He asserts that he has no role in orchestrating plots connected to the group, but simultaneously refuses to condemn attacks linked to them. Mason would later mention in a separate interview with MSNBC that members of have often disclosed to him their intentions to commit acts of violence, including Sam Woodward, who was later charged with the murder of Blaze Bernstein.   

On March 14, 2020, Mason claimed that the Atomwaffen Division had disbanded. However, the group was believed to be on the cusp of being designated a Foreign Terrorist Organization by the State Department, and the Anti-Defamation League concluded "the move is designed to give members breathing room rather than actually end their militant activities". According to SITE Intelligence Group, Atomwaffen and its offshoots remain clandestinely active.

Mason has also been known to receive foreign admirers in his Denver home, including members of the Nordic Resistance Movement, a proscribed Finnish terrorist organization, and affiliated neo-Nazi music collective "Bolt of Ukko".

Political views
Mason believes that the neo-Nazis cannot take power as long as the existing U.S. government remains in place, and has advocated murder and violence to create chaos and anarchy, thereby destabilizing the government. In his publication Siege, Mason would argue that the death of American Nazi Leader, George Lincoln Rockwell was crucial in the adoption of terror tactics. He claims that without Rockwell's leadership, National Socialism could no longer function as a legitimate political party, making what he describes as "revolutionary tactics" the only viable option. 
Mason considers the terrorists Timothy McVeigh and James Fields Jr. to be "heroes" and promulgates anti-Semitic conspiracy theories. He expressed that the election of Donald Trump gave him hope, commenting that "in order to Make America Great Again, you have to make it White again".

Writing 
Mason's writings are considered influential among radical right-wing and neo-Nazi movements. Between 1978 and 1980, he worked with the NSWPP and edited The Stormer, their newsletter.

In 1980, Mason took over writing Siege, the newsletter of the NSLF. He continued publishing until 1986. In the newsletter, Mason paid tribute to Adolf Hitler, Joseph Tommasi, Charles Manson, and Savitri Devi, and advocated random attacks and murders in order to destabilize society. In 1992, the newsletters were edited and published in book form as Siege: The Collected Writings of James Mason by Michael Jenkins Moynihan. The book acquired a neo-Nazi following and is now required reading for initiates of the Atomwaffen Division.

In 2000, he published The Theocrat, a comparison of Bible passages and passages in Hitler's Mein Kampf.

Designation as a terrorist 
On June 25, 2021, it was announced that James Mason had been added to the entities designated as terrorist by Canada. Mason is only the second individual to be specifically added to the list.

References

1952 births
Living people
Alt-right
Accelerationism
American conspiracy theorists
American Nazi Party members
Manson Family
People from Chillicothe, Ohio
Organizations designated as terrorist by Canada
Terrorism in the United States
American people convicted of child pornography offenses
American people convicted of child sexual abuse